Rage and Fury is an album by the reggae band Steel Pulse, released in 1997.

"Black Enough" is a cover of the Gamble and Huff song.

The album was nominated for a Grammy Award, in the "Best Reggae Album" category.

Critical reception
Vibe thought that the album's best songs "lyrically balance sophisticated introspection with youthful rebellion."

Track listing
"Emotional Prisoner" – 4:39
"Role Model" – 4:24
"I Spy... (No Stranger to Danger)" – 4:14
"Settle the Score" – 4:33
"Brown Eyed Girl" – 3:47
"The Real Terrorist" – 4:41
"Black and Proud" – 4:35
"Ku Klux Klan" – 3:48
"House of Love" – 4:21
"Blame on Me" – 3:59
"Black Enough" – 5:00
"Peace Party" – 4:31
"Spiritualize It" – 4:49
"KKK in the Jungle" – 4:41

References

Steel Pulse albums
1997 albums
Atlantic Records albums